was a scholar-bureaucrat, physician and surgeon of the Ryūkyū Kingdom. He was the first surgeon on Okinawa to give vaccinations against cowpox.

"Nakachi Kijin" was his Japanese style name, while  was his Chinese style name.

Life
Nakachi was born in a physician's family; both his father and grandfather were surgeons. When he was 26 years old, he went to Fuzhou to study internal medicine and ophthalmology. Three years later, he decided to go home, but was caught in a storm midway there and later drifted into the Satsuma Domain. He studied surgery there, and went back to Ryukyu one year later.

He studied cowpox vaccination from Bernard Jean Bettelheim, the first Christian missionary to Ryukyu, in 1846. He had done a long-term experiment, and began to give the cowpox vaccine two years later. He received rewards from the king, Shō Iku, and was appointed "imperial physician".

References
『沖縄大百科事典』、沖縄タイムス、1983年

See also
Takamine Tokumei
Itō Genboku

Japanese surgeons
Japanese immunologists
People of the Ryukyu Kingdom
18th-century Ryukyuan people
19th-century Ryukyuan people
1789 births
1859 deaths